Harutaeographa stangelmaieri is a moth of the family Noctuidae. It is found in China (the Daxue Shan Mountains in Yunnan).

References

Moths described in 2010
Orthosiini